Pollen is a programming language that extends the syntax and functionality of XML.
Unlike XML, Pollen is a Turing-complete programming language, which means it is capable of simulating any algorithm or computation that can be performed by a computer.

The Pollen reference implementation is written in C and supports the use of plug-ins written in any language.

References

External links 
 Official webpage
 GitHub repository

High-level programming languages